Paul Suni is a  Silicon Valley technologist, engineer, semiconductor device physicist and independent researcher. Since 1984, he has contributed to advancements in semiconductor electronics, photonics, digital imaging sensors and medical devices. In 2007, he dedicated himself to research concerning the scientific and philosophical foundations of technology and wellbeing.

Chronology
Suni was born in Helsinki, Finland. He studied at the University of California at Berkeley (Experimental Quantum Physics); Stanford University (Semiconductor Device Physics); the Institute for Theoretical Physics at University of Helsinki (Theoretical Physics) and Helsinki Conservatory of Music (Classical Piano and Music Theory). He earned an undergraduate degree in physics from U.C. Berkeley in 1983; attended graduate school in Electrical Engineering at Stanford University 1985-1986 and has lived in Silicon Valley since then.

Suni joined Fairchild Semiconductor in 1984 where he specialized in image sensor technology and worked as an R&D group leader. Committed to creative independence, he developed a broad set of expertise that grew out of his work in semiconductor device physics, image sensor design and technology integration. In 1992, he joined Orbit Semiconductor to start up Orbit's image sensor technology group, which he spun off as Suni Imaging Microsystems in 1995 and which he later repositioned as Suni Medical Imaging, Inc.  In order to pursue his long-standing intellectual avocation of integration concerning foundations of science, he retired from Suni Medical Imaging as CEO and Chief Technology Officer in 2007, after the company was acquired by German private equity firm Forstgarten Holdings.  [1]-[3]

Contributions to dental digital radiography
Suni is known as The Father of Digital Radiography for his invention of, and subsequent development of the world's first film-sized diagnostic quality intra-oral digital radiography sensors under contract with Sirona Dental Systems, formerly Schick Technologies, in 1992-93. By 2004, he had contributed technologies for the launching of more than half of dental digital radiography brands in the world including the Dr. Suni digital radiography system introduced by Suni Medical Imaging in 2003. Digital radiography eliminates x-ray film and associated toxic chemicals in dentistry by employing a re-usable semiconductor imaging device to capture x-rays. Digital Radiography significantly improves diagnostics, economics and workflow in dental practice. By eliminating the need for x-ray film, toxic chemicals, and reducing x-ray dose exposure requirements, the adoption of digital radiography improves both patient and environmental health and safety. [4],[6]

Other scientific contributions
Other scientific and medical applications for which Suni and his Silicon Valley teams developed enabling technologies include Digital Mammography; CMOS-CCD System-on-a-Chip (SoC) technology; Wafer-scale Integration (WSI); CCD Astronomy in visible and x-ray spectra; CEREC dental robotics; Optical Processing; ICP Optical Emission Spectroscopy and High-Speed DVD/ CD-ROM technology. Known for his preference for industrial trade secrecy, he generated a limited number of patents and confined his publishing activities to invited technical articles, scientific papers and conference keynote speeches. Several of his innovations have been featured on the front covers of leading professional periodicals. [5]-[20]

Suni's academic collaborations include research and development of scientific image sensors performed under the auspices of Massachusetts Institute of Technology, Harvard University, University of California at Santa Cruz and Louisiana State University.

Suni and his teams also engaged in U.S. Government sponsored research, claiming to have received several million dollars in research grants from the National Cancer Institute (digital mammography), National Institute for Dental Research (intraoral radiography) and the Defense Advanced Research Projects Agency (DARPA) (optical processing). [21]-[22]

References

[1] Integral Cognitive Institute www.integralcognitive.com
[2] Suni Medical Imaging www.suni.com
[3] Paul Suni professional profile http://www.linkedin.com/in/paulsuniprofile
[4] M. Florman, D.D.S: The Adoption and Practice of Digital Dental Radiography
[5] Dental Products Report: SUNI, January 2005
[6] Dental Town Magazine: Success Born from Experience, November 2004
[7] Electrical Engineering Times: Start-up Develops Digital Imaging System on a Chip, January 1997
[8] Laser Focus World: Advanced Design Creates Single-Chip Vision Systems, April 1996
[9] Laser Focus World: Custom Photodetector Arrays Meet Design Challenges, May 1994
[10] Photonics Spectra: [10 Megapixel Scientific CCD Article], ca. 1993
[11] P. Suni: CCD Wafer Scale Integration, Proc. IEEE, 1995
[12] P. Suni et al.: 4Kx2K Three-Side Buttable Scientific CCD Imager Design and Fabrication, Proc. of the SPIE, 1994
[13] P. Suni: CCD Technology at Orbit Semiconductor, Inc., International Conference on Scientific Optical Imaging, 1992
[14] P. Suni: Photodetector Arrays for Optical Processing, Proc. of the SPIE, 1990
[15] P. Suni et al.: A Linear 1024 Element High-Speed, Wide Dynamic Range CCD Photodetector Array, Proc. of the SPIE, 1989
[16] U.S. Patent 4967249: Gain Compression Photodetector Array
[17] U.S. Patent 4958207: Floating Diode Gain Compression
[18] U.S. Patent 5602407: Switched CCD Electrode Photodetector
[19] U.S. Patent 5757011: X-ray Onset Detector and Method
[20] U.S. Patent 5802025: Track Detection Methods and Apparatus for Simultaneously Monitoring Adjacent Tracks Of An Optical Disk
[21] NIH Grant R44CA080407
[22] NIH Grant R44DE012844

21st-century American engineers
1956 births
Living people